Beyond the Mountains may refer to:

 Beyond the Mountains (film), a 1967 American-Spanish dramatic adventure film directed by Alexander Ramati 
 Beyond the Mountains (play), a play by Kenneth Rexroth
 Beyond the Mountains and Hills, a 2016 Israeli drama film directed by Eran Kolirin